Chiro may refer to:

 Chiro (town), a town in Ethiopia
 Chiro (woreda), a former district of Ethiopia
 chiro-, a prefix referring to hands, or to chirality
 Chiro Flanders, a Belgian Christian youth organisation
 Chiro Philippines, a Philippine Catholic youth organisation
 Chiro (Super Robot Monkey Team Hyperforce Go!), a fictional character

People with the name 
 Giovanni Di Chiro, Italian-American neuroradiologist
 SJ Chiro, American screenwriter and director
 Chiró N'Toko, Zairian–Belgian footballer

See also 

 Charo (disambiguation)
 Cairo, the capital of Egypt
 Chirro
 Chi-Ro, a Japanese tank model
 Chi Rho, a Christian symbol
 Ciro (disambiguation)
 Chiron (disambiguation)
 Cheiro, Irish astrologer